Ariel Levy may refer to:

 Ariel Levy (writer) (born 1974), American journalist
 Ariel Levy (actor) (born 1984), Chilean actor and singer